Jorge Varela Carmona (born 7 July 1994) is a Spanish kickboxer.

As of September 2020, he was the #10 ranked Super Flyweight in the world by Combat Press.

Kickboxing career
Varela faced Ramzik Ghulinyan for the WKL Intercontinental -63 kg title on the May 6, 2017 Mix Fight event. He won the fight by decision.

Varela participated in the K-1 World GP 2018 2nd Featherweight Championship Tournament, which was held on June 17, 2018. Varela faced Kaito Ozawa in the tournament quarterfinals and won the fight by a first-round knockout. Advancing to the tournament semifinals, Varela faced the former RISE Bantamweight champion Yuta Murakoshi. Murakoshi won the fight by unanimous decision, after an extra round was contested.

Varela faced Ryusei Ashizawa at K-1 World GP 2019: K’FESTA 2 on March 10, 2019. He won the fight by a first-round knockout, flooring Ashizawa with a left hook near the end of the opening round.

Varela made his third K-1 appearance against Haruma Saikyo at K-1 World GP 2019 Super Bantamweight World Tournament on June 30, 2019. He lost the fight by a third-round knockout.

Varela made his return to WLF to face Wang Junguang at Wu Lin Feng 2019: WLF -67kg World Cup 2019-2020 3rd Group Stage on August 31, 2019. Junguang won the fight by a fourth-round knockout.

Varela was booked to face Yuki Egawa at K-1 World GP 2019 Yokohamatsuri on November 24, 2019, in the quarterfinal bout of the K-1 featherweight tournament. He lost the fight by a first-round knockout.

Titles

Professional
 2017 WKL Intercontinental -63 kg Champion
 2017 ISKA European -57 kg Champion

Amateur

 2013 IFMA Spain Champion
 2014 IFMA Andalucía champion

Kickboxing record 

|-  style="background:#FFBBBB;"
| 2019-11-24 || Loss|| align=left| Yuki Egawa || K-1 World GP 2019 Yokohamatsuri, -57 kg Tournament Quarter Final  || Yokohama, Japan || KO (Left Hook to the Body)	|| 1 || 1:49
|-  style="background:#FFBBBB;"
| 2019-08-31|| Loss||align=left| Wang Junguang || Wu Lin Feng 2019: WLF -67kg World Cup 2019-2020 3rd Group Stage || Zhengzhou, China || KO (Spinning Back Kick to the body) || 4 || 0:55  
|-
! style=background:white colspan=9 |
|-  style="background:#FFBBBB;"
| 2019-06-30|| Loss ||align=left| Haruma Saikyo || K-1 World GP 2019 Super Bantamweight World Tournament || Saitama, Japan || KO (Knee to the head) || 3 || 1:27
|-  style="background:#CCFFCC;"
| 2019-03-10|| Win ||align=left| Ryusei Ashizawa || K-1 World GP 2019: K’FESTA 2 || Saitama, Japan || KO (Left hook) || 1 || 2:41
|-  style="background:#FFBBBB;"
| 2019-01-19|| Loss||align=left| Zhao Chongyang || Wu Lin Feng 2019: WLF World Cup 2018-2019 Final || Haikou, China || Decision || 3 || 3:00
|-  style="background:#FFBBBB;"
| 2018-06-17|| Loss ||align=left| Yuta Murakoshi || K-1 World GP 2018: 2nd Featherweight Championship Tournament, Semi Final || Saitama, Japan || Ext. R. Decision (Unanimous) || 4 || 3:00
|-  style="background:#CCFFCC;"
| 2018-06-17|| Win ||align=left| Kaito Ozawa || K-1 World GP 2018 2nd Featherweight Championship Tournament, Quarter Final || Saitama, Japan || TKO (Two knockdowns) || 1 || 2:57
|-  style="background:#CCFFCC;"
| 2018-04-07|| Win ||align=left| Helder Victor || Shocktime || Spain || Decision || 3 || 3:00
|-  style="background:#CCFFCC;"
| 2017-11-12|| Win ||align=left| Nelson Moreira || Kryssing World Series || Seville, Spain || Decision || 3 || 3:00
|-  style="background:#CCFFCC;"
| 2017-05-06|| Win ||align=left| Ramzik Ghulinyan || Mix Fight || Spain || Decision || 5 || 3:00
|-
! style=background:white colspan=9 |
|-  style="background:#CCFFCC;"
| 2017-04-08|| Win ||align=left| Bernardo Mendes || Kryssing World Series || Spain || Decision || 5 || 3:00
|-
! style=background:white colspan=9 |
|-  style="background:#CCFFCC;"
| 2017-03-04|| Win ||align=left| Karim Zamora || Kryssing World Series || Spain || Decision || 3 || 3:00
|-  style="background:#c5d2ea;"
| 2016-09-24|| Draw||align=left| Xavi Lantaron || Gran Slam V || Malaga, Spain || Decision || 3 || 3:00
|-  style="background:#;"
| 2016-05-21|| ||align=left|  ||  || Portugal || ||  ||
|-  style="background:#FFBBBB;"
| 2016-03-19|| Loss ||align=left| Jaime Roldán || World Fight Tour || Seville, Spain || Decision || 3 || 3:00
|-  style="background:#FFBBBB;"
| 2016-02-13 || Loss ||align=left| Jordan Williams ||  || Newcastle, England || Decision || 3 || 3:00
|-
| colspan=9 | Legend:

See also 
List of male kickboxers

References

1994 births
Living people
Spanish male kickboxers
Sportspeople from Seville